is a Japanese voice actor who was born in Saitama Prefecture and is affiliated with Aoni Production. His best known roles are in WorldEnd as Willem Kmetsch and Battle Spirits: Burning Soul as Toshiie "Toshi" Homura.

Filmography

Television animation
Saint Seiya Omega (2013) (Romulus)
Battle Spirits: Burning Soul (2015) (Toshiie "Toshi" Homura)
Lance N' Masques (2015) (Dorgon)
World Trigger (2015) (Fumifumi Saotome)
WorldEnd (2017) (Willem Kmetsch)
One Piece (2019) (Charlotte Newichi)
World Trigger Season 3 (2021) (Ryūji Saeki)
Sasaki and Miyano (2022) (Tasuku Kuresawa)
Tales of Luminaria: The Fateful Crossroad (2022) (Leo Fourcade)

Animated films
Sailor Moon Eternal (2021) (Zeolite)
Sasaki and Miyano: Sotsugyō-hen (2023) (Tasuku Kuresawa)

Video games
Ys VIII: Lacrimosa of Dana (2016) (Ed and Licht)
 Tales of Link (2016) (Sesk)
 Super Robot Wars X (2018) (Iori Iolite)
 Jump Force (2019) (Male Avatar)
 Tales of Luminaria (2021) (Leo Fourcade)
 Counter:Side (2021) (Kyle Wong)
 Digimon Survive (2022) (Kunemon)
 Xenoblade Chronicles 3 (2022) (Noah)
 Octopath Traveler II (2023) (Scaracci)

Dubbing
 Love in the Moonlight (2016) (Kim Yoon-sung) (Jinyoung)

References

External links
 
 

Living people
Komazawa University alumni
Japanese male voice actors
Japanese male video game actors
Male voice actors from Saitama Prefecture
Aoni Production voice actors
Year of birth missing (living people)